The Dunham School is an independent, inter-denominational, Christian, college-preparatory, coeducational day school in unincorporated East Baton Rouge Parish, Louisiana. Located in the Oak Hills Place census-designated place, and founded in 1981, it serves students from pre-kindergarten through grade twelve. The school is accredited by the Southern Association of Colleges and Schools, and the Louisiana Department of Education and is a member of the National Association of Independent Schools. The school also won a 2005 Blue Ribbon Award and has been recognized as a seven-time Apple Distinguished School for its one-to-one laptop program, which was started in 2009.

It is in the proposed City of St. George.

Campus 

The campus is located on 23 acres (93,000 m2) in the Wimbledon subdivision off Perkins Road in South Baton Rouge. The school has a total of 89 classrooms. The Lower School Complex consists of 30 classroom spaces, a library, a music studio and an art studio. The Brown-Holt Chapel Arts Center is the central hub for artistic expression at the school. The school's weekly chapel services take place here as well as the yearly fine art performances. Brown-Holt contains the Dunham Family chapel auditorium, two art studios, a black box theatre, as well as the band and choir studio spaces. The campus also includes a 12,000 square foot athletic center, weight and training rooms, baseball and softball fields, Lower and Middle School gymnasium, Upper School gymnasium, golf practice facility with putting green, football and soccer complex, and an indoor baseball practice facility. The McKay Academic Center (MAC) focuses on specialized learning for students that learn differently. The MAC hosts eleven classrooms itself.

For the 2020–2021 school year there are 91 faculty and 37 staff members and 761 enrolled students: 282 in the Upper School, 226 in the Middle School, and 253 in the Lower School.

Athletics
The Dunham School athletics competes in the LHSAA.

Championships
Football championships
(1) State Championship: 2004

Baseball championships
(1) State Championship: 1987

Boys' basketball championships
(3) State Championship: 1998, 2018, 2020

Notable alumni 
Cary Koch, former CFL professional football player for the Saskatchewan Roughriders, Class of 2004.
Collin Ellis, former linebacker for the Northwestern Wildcats, Class of 2010.
Tyler Moore, professional minor league baseball player for the Lincoln Saltdogs, 2014 SEC Tournament MVP as catcher for LSU Tigers, Class of 2011.
Alys Murray, author and screenwriter for Crown Media Holdings, Lifetime (TV network), and Bookouture, Class of 2013.
Chase Day, linebacker for the Louisiana-Monroe Warhawks, Class of 2015.
Derek Stingley Jr., All-American defensive back for the LSU Tigers, Class of 2019.
Jordan Wright, guard for the Vanderbilt Commodores men's basketball team, Class of 2019.

See also 
List of high schools in Louisiana

References

External links 
 Dunham School

Schools in East Baton Rouge Parish, Louisiana
Educational institutions established in 1981
Private K-12 schools in Louisiana
1981 establishments in Louisiana